Nancy Lyle (26 February 1910 – 1986) was a female tennis player from the United Kingdom who was active in the 1930s. She was also known by her married name, Nancy Lyle Glover.

Early life and tennis

Nancy Lyle was born in London on 26 February 1910 and received education at St. Felix School in Southwold. She learnt playing tennis from her father Leonard Lyle, 1st Baron Lyle of Westbourne, an industrialist and politician who had also competed at Wimbledon.

Nancy Lyle's biggest success at Grand Slam level came in 1935 when she partnered with Evelyn Dearman to win the doubles title at the 1935 Australian Championships, defeating Louie Bickerton and Nell Hall Hopman in the final in straight sets. Lyle and Dearman also won the doubles titles at the German Championships (1933) as well as the state championships of New South Wales and Victoria, Australia (1934).

She was a member of the British team at 1934 and 1935 Wightman Cup, the annual women's team tennis competition between the United States and Great Britain, and in both editions won her doubles match partnering Dearman.

Grand Slam finals

Singles: (1 runner-up)

Doubles: (1 title)

See also 
 Performance timelines for all female tennis players who reached at least one Grand Slam final

References

1910 births
1986 deaths
Australian Championships (tennis) champions
Grand Slam (tennis) champions in women's doubles
British female tennis players
Date of death missing
People educated at Saint Felix School
English female tennis players
Tennis people from Greater London